Mairie de Saint-Ouen is a station on line 13  & line 14 of the Paris Métro in the commune of Saint-Ouen. It is named after the nearby town hall of Saint-Ouen.

Location
Line 13 station is located under Place de la République, at the intersection of Avenue Gabriel-Péri, Boulevard Victor-Hugo and Boulevard Jean-Jaurès. That of line 14 is located slightly further north, at the intersection of Boulevard Jean-Jaurès, Rue du Docteur-Bauer and Rue Albert-Dhalenne. The line 13 tunnel is located parallel to and above that of line 14. A short connecting corridor connects the latter's station to the platform of line 13 in the direction of Châtillon.

History
The station opened on 30 June 1952 when line 13 was extended from Porte de Saint-Ouen to Carrefour Pleyel.

In 2019, according to RATP estimates, the station's annual use was 4,314,548, which places it in 107th position among metro stations for its use.

On the occasion of the opening of the platforms for line 14, the station name bears the caption Région Île-de-France, the headquarters of the Regional Council of Île-de-France located about 200 meters to the west at 2 Rue Simone-Veil, in the Docks de Saint-Ouen eco-district.

Extension of line 14
At the end of 2020, line 14 was extended by 5.9 km from Saint-Lazare to the station. It's therefore the first connection between two Paris metro lines outside the capital.The construction of the Mairie de Saint-Ouen station was entrusted to the Bouygues TP, Solétanche Bachy France, Solétanche Bachy tunnel and CSM Bessac consortium. Structural work began in April 2015. The platforms for line 14 opened on 14 December 2020.

Subsequently, in 2024, line 14 will be extended to Saint-Denis Pleyel.

Passenger services

Access
The station has five entrances:
 Entrance 1: Avenue Gabriel-Peri;
 Entrance 2: Boulevard Victor-Hugo;
 Entrance 3: Boulevard Jean-Jaurès;
 Entrance 4: Esplanade Jean Moulin;
 Entrance 5: Rue Albert Dhalenne.

The first three entrances are located in the Place de la République, and converge on a ticket room. They are complemented by an escalator that leads directly to the road, from the platform in the direction of Saint-Denis.

When Line 14 was put into service, two other entrances were installed on Boulevard Jean-Jaurès on either side of Rue Albert-Dhalenne. These two entrances are located on the ground floor of buildings that will be erected later above entrances.

Station layout

Platforms

Line 13 station has a standard configuration. It has two platforms separated by the metro tracks and the arch is elliptical. The decoration is in the Ouï-dire style in red. The lighting canopy, is in the same colour, supported by curved brackets in the shape of a scythe. The direct lighting is white while the indirect lighting, projected on the vault, is multi-coloured. The white ceramic tiles are flat and cover the walls, the vault and the tunnel exits. The advertising frames are red and cylindrical and the name of the station is written in the Parisine font on enamel plates. The platforms are equipped with red Motte style seats.

The line 14 station has platform screen doors. The floor and walls are covered with bevelled white tiles.

Bus connections
The station is served by lines 85, 137, 140, 166, 173, 237, 274 and the L'Audonienne urban service of the RATP Bus Network and, at night, by lines N14 and N44 of the Noctilien network.

Nearby
 Mairie de Saint-Ouen-sur-Seine
 Alstom Transport, siège social
 Hôtel des impôts de Saint-Ouen-sur-Seine
 Conseil régional d'Île-de-France
 Grand Parc des Docks de Saint-Ouen

References

Paris Métro stations in Saint-Ouen, Seine-Saint-Denis
Paris Métro line 13
Railway stations in France opened in 1952